The Shadow Mountains are located in the Mojave Desert in California.

Shadow Mountains or Shadow Mountain may also refer to:
Shadow Mountain, an isolated peak in the Shadow Mountains
Shadow Mountain Publishing, an imprint of Deseret Book Company
Shadow Mountain Records, a division of Deseret Book Company